Massimiliano Masin (born 9 July 1968) is a retired Italian professional baseball pitcher. He played for the Italian national baseball team in the 1992 Summer Olympics and the 1996 Summer Olympics. He played professionally for the Nettuno Baseball Club.

External links

1968 births
Baseball players at the 1992 Summer Olympics
Baseball players at the 1996 Summer Olympics
Olympic baseball players of Italy
Living people
Nettuno Baseball Club players
Sportspeople from Rome